Polpully is a village and gram panchayat in Palakkad district in the state of Kerala, India. The village is located 10 km from Palakkad city, and 5 km from Chittur.

Demographics
 India census, Polpully is a large village located in Palakkad of Palakkad district, Kerala with total 3894 families residing. The Polpully village has population of 16500 of which 8029 are males while 8471 are females as per Population Census 2011.

in Polpully village population of children with age 0-6 is 1460 which makes up 8.85 % of total population of village. Average sex patio of Polpully village is 1055 which is lower than Kerala state average of 1084. Child sex ratio for the Polpully as per census is 891, lower than Kerala average of 964.

Polpully village has lower literacy rate compared to Kerala. In 2011, literacy rate of Polpully village was 84.73 % compared to 94.00 % of Kerala. In Polpully Male literacy stands at 91.04 % while female literacy rate was 78.84 %. 

As per constitution of India and Panchyati Raaj Act, Polpully village is administrated by Sarpanch (Head of Village) who is elected representative of village.

Educational Institutions
In Polpully grama panchayat one can have their basic education. KVM Upper primary Aided School is one of the old schools in the panchayat. It was founded in the year 1947. PGP Higher Secondary School is the only higher secondary school in the panachayat.

Attractions
One of the main attraction of Polpully is the Perunkurichiappan temple (Lord Shiva), which attracts many peoples from the neighbouring states. Every year "Desa Niramala" is very well celebrated in this temple. The premises of temple is covered by paddy fields, a temple pond and also there is a small river "Thodu" flowing near to the temple in which a small dam like structure is present for irrigation purposes. Eventually the river joins with the Chittur puzha and later to the Bharathapuzha.

There are also some more main places for workship in Polpully grama panchayath: Sree Polpully Bhagavathy temple and Sree Perunkurussi Bhagavathy temple are within half kilometer distance of main Siva temple, Sree Elaya Bhagavathy temple, Thirunagappilly Siva temple, Sri Chemittiya Bhagavathy temple, Madharasathul Kuraniya Juma Masjid, Sri Venugopalaswamy temple situated in Coolimuttam Gramam, Coolimuttam Mariyamman temple.

Festival
The most important and prestigious festival of Polpully is the Vishu-Vela which is held every year on April 20. Vishu-vela is a festival mainly seen in Palakkad. It is celebrated either before the festival of Vishu or after that. Polpully folk lore has it that two youth from the village went to attend the Vishu-Vela in a neighbouring village which ended up in a fight and they took it upon themselves to celebrate it in Polpully every year since then. The tradition in Polpully could be as old as 100 years.

The festivities mainly consists of the following programs starting mid-afternoon and up to midnight. An Elephant being paraded in a procession with the village deity Polpully Bhagavathy atop it. It starts from the Polpully Bhagavathy Kshetram to the Mannam (village central area).Then about a kilometer distance is covered with various stoppages along the route. The procession would be accompanied by the villagers and a band of musicians playing the Panchavadyam and it usually takes about 4 hours in the evening,followed by Vedikettu (Fire works) and  Double Thayambaka. The number of elephants varies from year to year. 

Coolimuttam Mariyamman pooja is another main festival of the panchayat. It is celebrated over a week. Many people from neighbouring villages/states join the celebration. The Coolimuttam houses are almost filled with the relatives. The Navarathri day festivals and Pongal are also celebrated.

References 

Villages in Palakkad district
Gram panchayats in Palakkad district